Wrestling Dontaku 2013 was a professional wrestling pay-per-view (PPV) event promoted by New Japan Pro-Wrestling (NJPW). The event took place on May 3, 2013, in Fukuoka, Fukuoka, at the Fukuoka Kokusai Center. The event featured ten matches (including one dark match), four of which were contested for championships. It was the tenth event under the Wrestling Dontaku name. This event also marks the start of Bullet Club.

Storylines
Wrestling Dontaku 2013 featured ten professional wrestling matches that involved different wrestlers from pre-existing scripted feuds and storylines. Wrestlers portrayed villains, heroes, or less distinguishable characters in the scripted events that built tension and culminated in a wrestling match or series of matches.

Event
Two titles changed hands during the event, first the Forever Hooligans (Alex Koslov and Rocky Romero) defeated Time Splitters (Alex Shelley and Kushida) for the IWGP Junior Heavyweight Tag Team Championship and then Tencozy (Hiroyoshi Tenzan and Satoshi Kojima) defeated K.E.S. (Davey Boy Smith Jr. and Lance Archer) for the IWGP Tag Team Championship in a four-way match. The event featured two matches in the storyline rivalry between the Complete Players and G.B.H. In the first Complete Player Masato Tanaka successfully defended the NEVER Openweight Championship against freelancer Tomoaki Honma, while in the second G.B.H. leader Togi Makabe defeated Yujiro Takahashi to end their three-month-long rivalry. Other successful title defenses saw IWGP Intercontinental Champion Shinsuke Nakamura defeat Shelton X Benjamin and IWGP Heavyweight Champion Kazuchika Okada defeat Minoru Suzuki. Post-match, Okada was challenged by Makabe, setting up the main event for Dominion 6.22. The event also saw a surprise appearance from Tetsuya Naito, who announced he was going to be returning from his knee surgery and wrestling his first match on June 22 at Dominion 6.22. In a major storyline development, Karl Anderson turned on Hiroshi Tanahashi after their match against each other and came together with Prince Devitt, Bad Luck Fale and Tama Tonga to form Bullet Club.

Results

References

External links
The official New Japan Pro-Wrestling website

2013
2013 in professional wrestling
May 2013 events in Japan